The Shire of Boulia is a local government area in Central West Queensland, bordering the Northern Territory. The main industry in the shire is beef production.

The shire is known for the unexplained phenomenon of the Min Min light, a light that has been reported to follow travellers in the area for some distance before disappearing.

On its logo, the Shire has the motto E pluribus unum.

History
Waluwarra (also known as Warluwarra, Walugara, and Walukara) is an Australian Aboriginal language of Western Queensland. Its traditional language region is the local government area of Shire of Boulia, including Walgra Station and Wolga, from Roxborough Downs north to Carandotta Station and Urandangi on the Georgina River, on Moonah Creek to Rochedale, south-east of Pituri Creek.

The Boulia Division was established on 24 September 1887.

On 31 March 1903, Boulia Division became the Shire of Boulia.

Towns and localities 
The Shire of Boulia includes the following settlements:

 Boulia
 Amaroo
 Georgina
 Min Min
 Piturie
 Toko
 Urandangi
 Warburton
 Warenda
 Waverley

Amenities 
Boulia Shire Council operates a public library in Boulia.

The Boulia Shire Hall is in Herbert Street and can be hired for functions.

Population

Chairmen and mayors
 1918: Joseph Richard Coghlan 
 1927: James Griffith Scholefield 
 2008–present: Eric Charles (Rick) Britton

References

External links
 
 
 

 
Local government areas of Queensland
1887 establishments in Australia